Ubaldo Gustavo Guardia Ledezma (born 8 June 1977) is a retired Panamanian football defender.

Club career
Tito Guardia started his career at Tauro, then moved to Europe to play for Moldovan champions Sheriff Tiraspol where he played alongside compatriot Alberto Blanco. He only returned to Tauro in 2005 after problems with his release by Sheriff. In May 2006 he was reported to be a new player for Colombian side Real Cartagena.

In February 2007, Guardia suffered a broken fibula and ruptured ankle ligaments in his left inner leg after a tackle by Chepo's captain Armando Gun. The injury was said to leave him out of the game for over 4 months.

International career
He played for the Panama U23 team in the 1997 Central American Games.

Guardia made his debut for Panama in a January 2000 friendly match against Guatemala and has earned a total of 41 caps, scoring no goals. He represented his country in 8 FIFA World Cup qualification matches and was a member of the 2005 CONCACAF Gold Cup team, who finished second in the tournament.

His final international was a February 2007 UNCAF Nations Cup match against Guatemala.

References

External links

1977 births
Living people
Association football defenders
Panamanian footballers
Panama international footballers
2001 UNCAF Nations Cup players
2005 CONCACAF Gold Cup players
2007 UNCAF Nations Cup players
Tauro F.C. players
FC Sheriff Tiraspol players
Panamanian expatriate footballers
Panamanian expatriate sportspeople in Moldova
Expatriate footballers in Moldova
Moldovan Super Liga players
Central American Games silver medalists for Panama
Central American Games medalists in football